Max Griffin (born November 29, 1985) is an American professional mixed martial artist. Griffin currently competes in the Welterweight division for the Ultimate Fighting Championship (UFC). A professional competitor since 2009, Griffin has also competed for Tachi Palace Fights, where he was the welterweight champion.

Background

Griffin was born in Santa Barbara, California, United States. He has a black belt in Bok Fu (a blend of Kenpo, Tae-Kwon-Do, and Kung Fu).

Mixed martial arts career

Early career
Griffin started his MMA career on October 10, 2009. He fought for many promoters, notably Gladiator Challenge, West Coast Fighting Championship, the Warriors Cage, and Tachi Palace Fights in California. He was the former West Coast Fighting Championship welterweight and middleweight champion. Griffin was also the Tachi Palace Fight welterweight champion, and he amassed a record of 12–2 prior joining UFC.

The Ultimate Fighter
Griffin was selected as one of the contestants for The Ultimate Fighter 16 in 2012; he lost to Matt Secor and was eliminated during the entry round.

Ultimate Fighting Championship
Griffin made his promotional debut on August 20, 2016 at UFC 202 against Colby Covington. He lost the fight via TKO in the third round.

Griffin faced Erick Montano on his next fight at The Ultimate Fighter Latin America 3 Finale: dos Anjos vs. Ferguson on November 5, 2016. He won the fight and claimed his first UFC win via knockout in the first round.

Griffin was expected to face Sérgio Moraes on March 11, 2017 at UFC Fight Night: Belfort vs. Gastelum. He was replaced by Davi Ramos as Griffin pulled out of the fight, citing an undisclosed injury.

Griffin faced Elizeu Zaleski dos Santos on October 28, 2017 at UFC Fight Night: Brunson vs. Machida. He lost the fight via unanimous decision. Despite the loss, Griffin was awarded the Fight of the Night bonus award.

In the last bout of his contract, Griffin faced Mike Perry on February 24, 2018 at UFC on Fox 28. He won the fight via unanimous decision.

Griffin faced Curtis Millender on July 7, 2018 at UFC 226. He lost the fight via unanimous decision.

Griffin faced Thiago Alves at UFC Fight Night 144 on February 2, 2019. He lost the back-and-forth fight via split decision. Conversely, 16 of 18 media outlets scored the bout in favor of Griffin.

Griffin faced Zelim Imadaev on April 13, 2019 at UFC 236. He won the fight via majority decision. Imadaev was deducted a point in the first round for grabbing the fence. After the fight, Griffin signed a new, five-fight contract with the UFC.

Griffin faced Alex Morono on October 12, 2019 at UFC Fight Night 161. He lost the fight via unanimous decision.
 
Griffin faced Alex Oliveira on March 7, 2020 at UFC 248. He lost the back-and-forth fight via split decision.

Griffin faced Ramiz Brahimaj on November 7, 2020 at UFC on ESPN: Santos vs. Teixeira. He won the fight via technical knockout due to a doctor stoppage after Brahimaj's ear was split open in round three.

Griffin faced Song Kenan on March 20, 2021 at UFC on ESPN 21.  He won the fight via knockout in round one. This win earned him the Performance of the Night award.

Griffin faced Carlos Condit on July 10, 2021 at UFC 264. He won the fight via unanimous decision.

Griffin faced Neil Magny on March 26, 2022 at UFC on ESPN 33. He lost the fight via split decision.

Griffin faced Tim Means on October 29, 2022 at UFC Fight Night 213. He won the fight via a split decision.

Personal life
Max and his fiancée Anastasia have a son, Tyrus (born 2021).

Championships and accomplishments

Mixed martial arts
Ultimate Fighting Championship
Fight of the Night (One time) vs. Elizeu Zaleski dos Santos
Performance of the Night (One time) 
West Coast Fighting Championship
West Coast Fighting Championship Welterweight Champion (One time) vs. Randall Wallace 
West Coast Fighting Championship Middleweight Champion (One time) vs. David Mitchell 
Tachi Palace Fight
Tachi Palace Fight Welterweight Champion (One time)  vs. Riky Legere

Mixed martial arts record

|-
|Win
|align=center|19–9
|Tim Means
|Decision (split)
|UFC Fight Night: Kattar vs. Allen
|
|align=center|3
|align=center|5:00
|Las Vegas, Nevada, United States
|
|-
|Loss
|align=center|18–9
|Neil Magny
|Decision (split)
|UFC on ESPN: Blaydes vs. Daukaus
|
|align=center|3
|align=center|5:00
|Columbus, Ohio, United States
|
|-
|Win
|align=center|18–8
|Carlos Condit
|Decision (unanimous)
|UFC 264
|
|align=center|3
|align=center|5:00
|Las Vegas, Nevada, United States
|
|-
|Win
|align=center|17–8
|Song Kenan
|KO (punches)
|UFC on ESPN: Brunson vs. Holland 
|
|align=center|1
|align=center|2:20
|Las Vegas, Nevada, United States
|
|-
|Win
|align=center|16–8
|Ramiz Brahimaj
|TKO (doctor stoppage)
|UFC on ESPN: Santos vs. Teixeira
|
|align=center|3
|align=center|2:03
|Las Vegas, Nevada, United States
|
|- 
|Loss
|align=center|15–8
|Alex Oliveira
|Decision (split)
|UFC 248
|
|align=center|3
|align=center|5:00
|Las Vegas, Nevada, United States
|
|-
|Loss
|align=center|15–7
|Alex Morono
|Decision (unanimous)
|UFC Fight Night: Joanna vs. Waterson 
|
|align=center|3
|align=center|5:00
|Tampa, Florida, United States
|
|-
|Win
|align=center| 15–6
|Zelim Imadaev
|Decision (majority)
|UFC 236 
|
|align=center|3
|align=center|5:00
|Atlanta, Georgia, United States
|
|-
|Loss
|align=center| 14–6
|Thiago Alves
|Decision (split)
|UFC Fight Night: Assunção vs. Moraes 2
|
|align=center|3
|align=center|5:00
|Fortaleza, Brazil 
|
|-
|Loss
|align=center| 14–5
|Curtis Millender
|Decision (unanimous)
|UFC 226 
|
|align=center|3
|align=center|5:00
|Las Vegas, Nevada, United States
|
|-
|Win
|align=center| 14–4
|Mike Perry
|Decision (unanimous)
|UFC on Fox: Emmett vs. Stephens
|
|align=center|3
|align=center|5:00
|Orlando, Florida, United States
|
|-
|Loss
|align=center| 13–4
|Elizeu Zaleski dos Santos
|Decision (unanimous)
|UFC Fight Night: Brunson vs. Machida
|
|align=center|3
|align=center|5:00
|São Paulo, Brazil
|
|-
|Win
|align=center| 13–3
|Erick Montaño
|TKO (punches)
|The Ultimate Fighter Latin America 3 Finale: dos Anjos vs. Ferguson
|
|align=center|1
|align=center|0:54
|Mexico City, Mexico
|
|-
|Loss
|align=center| 12–3
|Colby Covington
|TKO (punches)
|UFC 202
|
|align=center|3
|align=center|2:18
|Las Vegas, Nevada, United States
|
|-
|Win
|align=center| 12–2
|David Mitchell
|KO (punch)
|West Coast FC 16
|
|align=center|1
|align=center|0:43
|Sacramento, California, United States
|
|-
|Win
|align=center| 11–2
|Randall Wallace
|TKO (punch)
|West Coast FC 15
|
|align=center|4
|align=center|1:44
|Sacramento, California, United States
|
|-
|Loss
|align=center| 10–2
|Chidi Njokuani
|Decision (split)
|Tachi Palace Fights 23
|
|align=center|5
|align=center|5:00
|Lemoore, California, United States
|
|-
|Win
|align=center| 10–1
|Ricky Legere Jr.
|KO (punch)
|Tachi Palace Fights 21
|
|align=center|1
|align=center|3:21
|Lemoore, California, United States
|
|-
|Win
|align=center| 9–1
|Randall Wallace
|Submission (rear-naked choke)
|Tachi Palace Fights 19
|
|align=center|2
|align=center|2:20
|Lemoore, California, United States
|
|-
|Win
|align=center| 8–1
|Waachiim Spiritwolf
|Decision (split)
|The Warriors Cage 19
|
|align=center|3
|align=center|5:00
|Porterville, California, United States
|
|-
|Win
|align=center| 7–1
|Fernando Gonzalez
|Decision (split)
|West Coast FC 7
|
|align=center|5
|align=center|5:00
|Sacramento, California, United States
|
|-
|Win
|align=center| 6–1
|Kito Andrew
|Decision (unanimous)
|West Coast FC 5
|
|align=center|5
|align=center|5:00
|Sacramento, California, United States
|
|-
|Win
|align=center| 5–1
|Richard Rigmaden
|Submission (anaconda choke)
|West Coast FC 4
|
|align=center|1
|align=center|0:56
|Sacramento, California, United States
|
|-
|Loss
|align=center| 4–1
|Justin Baesman
|Decision (split)
|West Coast FC: Showdown
|
|align=center|5
|align=center|5:00
|Yuba City, California, United States
|
|-
|Win
|align=center| 4–0 
|Jaime Jara
|KO (punch)
|West Coast FC: Bruvada Bash
|
|align=center|1
|align=center|0:56
|Placerville, California, United States
|
|-
|Win
|align=center| 3–0 
|Joshua Miranda
|Decision (unanimous)
|Gladiator Challenge: Impulse
|
|align=center|3
|align=center|5:00
|Placerville, California, United States
|
|-
|Win
|align=center| 2–0 
|Aaron Hamilton
|TKO (punches)
|Gladiator Challenge: Undisputed
|
|align=center|2
|align=center|2:20
|Placerville, California, United States
|
|-
|Win
|align=center| 1–0 
|Kino Vuittonet
|TKO (punches)
|Gladiator Challenge: First Strike
|
|align=center|1
|align=center|0:25
|Placerville, California, United States
|
|-

See also
 List of current UFC fighters
 List of male mixed martial artists

References

External links
 

Living people
1985 births
American male mixed martial artists
Welterweight mixed martial artists
Mixed martial artists utilizing kickboxing
Sportspeople from Santa Barbara, California
Sportspeople from Sacramento, California
Mixed martial artists from California
Ultimate Fighting Championship male fighters